Zanesfield is a village in Logan County, Ohio, United States of America. The population was 197 at the 2010 census.  It is the smallest incorporated village in Logan County.

History

Zanesfield is named for Isaac Zane, who was born in 1753 in what was then Berkeley County, Virginia, and is now Hardy County, West Virginia. He was the youngest brother of Ebenezer Zane, for whom Zanesville, Ohio, is named.

In 1762 at the age of nine, Isaac was captured by Native Americans of the Wyandot tribe and adopted into the tribe.  He lived with them along the Sandusky River for seventeen years.  He married Myeerah (White Crane), daughter of Chief Tarhe.  They had several children.

His Wyandot connections and bilingual abilities served Zane well.  He later served as a guide to the Commissioners of the Northwest Territory during their treaty conferences with the Native Americans. Zane purchased  from the federal government at the site of Zanesfield in about 1795.  In return for his service to the United States, in 1802, the United States Congress granted Isaac Zane three tracts totalling  in Champaign County, Ohio (see Zane's Tracts#Isaac Zane Tracts). In 1803, he was elected as one of the first trustees of Jefferson Township. Isaac Zane died in 1816, and was buried near Zanesfield.

The village was laid out in 1819 by Alexander Long and Ebenezer Zane.

Geography
Zanesfield is located at  (40.338242, -83.677990).

Demographics

2010 census
As of the census of 2010, there were 197 people, 88 households, and 62 families living in the village. The racial makeup of the village was 96.4% White, 2.0% African American, 1.0% Pacific Islander, and 0.5% from two or more races.

There were 88 households, of which 27.3% had children under the age of 18 living with them, 54.5% were married couples living together, 11.4% had a female householder with no husband present, 4.5% had a male householder with no wife present, and 29.5% were non-families. 22.7% of all households were made up of individuals, and 6.8% had someone living alone who was 65 years of age or older. The average household size was 2.24 and the average family size was 2.65.

The median age in the village was 42.4 years. 22.8% of residents were under the age of 18; 4.7% were between the ages of 18 and 24; 26.4% were from 25 to 44; 32% were from 45 to 64; and 14.2% were 65 years of age or older. The gender makeup of the village was 43.7% male and 56.3% female.

2000 census
As of the census of 2000, there were 220 people, 96 households, and 57 families living in the village. The population density was 1,867.6 people per square mile (707.9/km2). There were 105 housing units at an average density of 891.4 per square mile (337.8/km2). The racial makeup of the village was 99.09% White, 0.45% Native American, and 0.45% from two or more races. There are no Hispanics or Latinos of any race.

There were 96 households, out of which 29.2% had children under the age of 18 living with them, 49.0% were married couples living together, 6.3% had a female householder with no husband present, and 39.6% were non-families. 35.4% of all households were made up of individuals, and 13.5% had someone living alone who was 65 years of age or older. The average household size was 2.29 and the average family size was 3.07.

In the village, the population was spread out, with 25.5% under the age of 18, 8.2% from 18 to 24, 30.0% from 25 to 44, 23.2% from 45 to 64, and 13.2% who were 65 years of age or older. The median age was 35 years. For every 100 females, there were 93.0 males. For every 100 females age 18 and over, there were 102.5 males.

The median income for a household in the village was $41,667, and the median income for a family was $57,500. Males had a median income of $36,786 versus $23,500 for females. The per capita income for the village was $19,869. None of the families and 0.9% of the population were living below the poverty line, including no under eighteens and 4.3% of those over 64.

Government
In November 2017, Justin Bo Johns was elected mayor.

On January 7, 2020, council member Jason Deal was selected by council to be council president. He then accepted an appointment to be the mayor through the end of 2021. The shift on council occurred because Justin Bo Johns did not seek re-election.

Transportation

Unlike most villages in Logan County, Zanesfield has no state highways; the only road access is provided through County Roads 5, 10, and 153.  The nearest highway is U.S. Route 33, a freeway with two interchanges a short distance from Zanesfield. Originally, U.S. 33 ran from Bellefontaine along a portion of the present-day County Road 540 then southwards entering on Water Street through Zanesfield and then southeast along Columbus Street before its move to its current location outside the village in 1964.

Notable people

Nicole Fawcett — award-winning volleyball player
Earl Sloan — entrepreneur and philanthropist

References

External links

 Detailed Logan County map

Villages in Ohio
Villages in Logan County, Ohio
Populated places established in 1819
1819 establishments in Ohio